Elora Gahar is a Bangladeshi film and television actress. She won Bangladesh National Film Award for Best Child Artist for the film Surja Dighal Bari (1979).

Selected films and drama
 Surja Dighal Bari - 1979
 Gangchil - 1980
 Naat Bou - 1982
 Choruivati - 2002
 Bachelor - 2004
 Chicken Tikka Masala - 2010
 Madhumati - 2011
 Chabial Reunion - 2017
 Abbas (2019)
 Laal Moroger Jhuti (2021)

Awards and nominations
National Film Awards

References

External links

Bangladeshi film actresses
Bangladeshi actresses
Bengali television actresses
Best Child Artist National Film Award (Bangladesh) winners
Living people
Year of birth missing (living people)
Best TV Actress Meril-Prothom Alo Critics Choice Award winners